Joseph Ascher (3 June 1829 – 20 June 1869) was a Dutch-Jewish composer and pianist. He lived in Paris and London for most of his life.

Life
Ascher was born in Groningen, the son of the chazzan of the city, who went on to become a cantor in London. He started his musical studies in London and continued them at the Leipzig Conservatory with Ignaz Moscheles as his teacher, but did not graduate.he died at age 40

His pianistic gifts were recognized by the Empress Eugénie of France, who asked him to become her court pianist in 1849. In 1865, Ascher moved back to London, while in Paris he was succeeded as court pianist by Émile Waldteufel. He died in London from the result of what some 19th-century sources call "a dissolute life". Brown (1886) regarded him as a "composer who, had he been more careful in his worldly relations, might have proved one of the greatest among recent musicians."

Music
Ascher composed about 170 works for piano, piano four- and eight-hands, as well as ballads and display pieces for solo singers with piano accompaniment. Brown (1886) wrote: "his music is more than commonplace, and many of his single pieces evince genius of a decidedly original turn. The numerous pieces which he has produced for the Pf. [NB.: the piano] are in general brilliant and effective in character; while several of them show tokens of real genius inspiration."

Selected works
Piano
Les Hirondelles op. 15, 1852
Thème russe op. 16, c. 1852
L'Orgie op. 21, 1854
Le Papillon op. 32, 1854
Styrienne op. 35, 1854
Fanfare militaire en forme de marche op. 40, 1854
Prière op. 42, 1855
Dans ma barque op. 47, 1856
Les Clochettes op. 48, 1856
La Sevillana op. 51, 1856
La Sylphide op. 57, 1857
Feuilles et fleurs op. 59, 1857
La Zingara op. 73, 1858
La Cascade de roses op. 80, 1858
Mon Enfant dort. Berceuse op. 88, 1860
Le Phalène op. 93, 1860
La Ronde des elfes op. 104, 1862
La Cloche du couvent op. 106, 1861
I Lazzaroni op. 112, 1863
Paraphrase de concert sur l'air irlandais 'The Last Rose of Summer op. 114, 1863
Les Sylphes des bois op. 119, 1865
Vision op. 120, 1865Songs'''Alice, Where Art Thou? (Wellington Guernsey), 1861I'll think of thee (Wellington Guernsey), 1862Thoughts of Home. An Alpine Song (Wellington Guernsey), 1864A Twilight Dream (George Linley), 1866Bygone Love (George Linley), 1866Mélanie'' (Maggioni), 1870

Reference Notes

External links

Free scores Mutopia Project
Jewish Encyclopedia: "Ascher, Joseph" by Joseph Jacobs and Goodman Lipkind (1906).

1829 births
1869 deaths
People from Groningen (city)
Dutch Jews
Dutch male classical composers
Dutch classical composers
Jewish classical musicians
Dutch Romantic composers
19th-century classical composers
19th-century Dutch male musicians